Salem Airport  is a regional airport located in Kamalapuram, Omalur taluka, 19 kilometres northwest of Salem, Tamil Nadu, India. Salem Airport is the sixth busiest airport in Tamil Nadu after Chennai, Coimbatore, Tiruchirappalli, Madurai, and Tuticorin. It is also the fifth largest airport in Tamil Nadu in terms of runway length.

History 
Salem Airport was constructed in April 1993 at a cost of Rs. 6 Crore, covering a sprawling 136 acres extensively donated by local traders and industrialists. A total of Rs. 49 lakh, including Rs. 30 lakh by Salem Steel Plant. Originally planned for Vayudoot services using small aircraft and conceived with a 1,350-metre runway, it was expanded by another 600 meters to accommodate bigger planes. Initially, NEPC Airlines operated flights on the Chennai–Salem–Coimbatore–Chennai corridor using Fokker F-27 aircraft. however, the airline withdrew the service after three months citing ‘non-viability’ as it's the main reason. The Salem Airport lay in disuse since then as no airline was willing to invest in this sector. Although the Airports Authority of India (AAI) had spruced up the airport and made it ready for operation, airlines did not show interest to fly, fearing low patronage. In 2006, Air Deccan agreed to kickstart its Salem operations but only if the local industry deposited at least Rs. 90 lakh or gave a commitment for 50% bookings. Meanwhile, Air Deccan merged with Kingfisher Airlines. Kingfisher Airlines did provide a service from Chennai, but terminated the service in 2012 owing to its financial problems.

After a 3-year wait and prolonged negotiations, Kingfisher Airlines commenced daily flights to Chennai using its ATR aircraft on 15 November 2009. The service was withdrawn on 28 October 2011, again citing poor patronage.

At last, flight service commenced again from Salem Airport under the Regional Connectivity Scheme (RCS) of the Ministry of Civil Aviation from March, 2018 by Trujet.

G. K. Chaukiyal, executive director (RCS) at Airports Authority of India (AAI), in an e-mail message to president of the Indian Chamber of Commerce and Industry, Salem, has said that the Hyderabad-based Turbo Megha Airways Private Limited has intimated the AAI of commencing the flight service from Salem Airport in the first week of December. Air Odisha is likely to commence its operation from Salem airport by the middle of February next year. It may be recalled that the AAI has already signed MoUs with these flight operators.

The Ministry of Civil Aviation had changed the status of Salem Airport to “served airport” from “underserved and unserved” status, to enable the introduction of flight service.

The only commercial passenger flight to Chennai operated by TruJet, was suspended after the airline was shutdown due to bankruptcy, and hence currently as of October 2022 there are no commercial flights operating from/to Salem.

Structure
Salem Airport has one runway, oriented 040/220 degrees, 6000 feet long. Its 200 by 75-meter apron is capable of handling 4 ATR aircraft and 2 large aircraft while its terminal building can cater to 100 passengers. Navigational facilities at Salem include VHF radio, PAPI, and an NDB.

New routes
The Salem Airport Advisory Committee meeting headed by the Salem Lok Sabha MP S. R. Parthiban was held in January 2020 in which new flight services from the airport will be started soon. The MP said
that services from the airport in the following routes would be commenced soon:

 Bengaluru to Puducherry via Salem
 Salem to Hyderabad via Tirupati
 Salem to Shirdi via Chennai
 Salem to Goa via Mangaluru

There is also constant demand from the people to operate flights to domestic destinations like Kochi, Coimbatore, Madurai which would be cost efficient and to international destinations like Dubai, Abu Dhabi, Kuala Lumpur, Singapore as most of the people in the region work in the above places.

The latest Airport Advisory Committee meeting was held at the Salem Airport in August 2020, said that talks are going on with IndiGo airlines to start new services from Salem Airport.

Connectivity
Frequent bus services are available from Town Bus Terminus and also from Central Bus Terminus via Omalur. Cab services, call taxis and auto rickshaws provide 24 hours commuting services to the airport.

Flight training and pilot training centers 
The excellent conditions prevailing at Salem Airport are highly suitable for flight training. Salem Airport is now the hotspot for the establishment of flight training and pilot training centers in southern India. Given the state of the art infrastructure available here, it is an ideal training airport and base for aspiring pilots. The reputed air charter operator based in Salem (Salem Air) has started pilot training services. Salem Aviation Services and the Salem Flying Club operate from Salem airport. Its already home to two flying schools based at Salem.

Expansion of airport 
The Government of Tamil Nadu has issued orders for the expansion of Salem Airport by acquiring an additional 570 acres of land from the nearby villages of Sikkanampatti, Thumbipadi, Pottiyapuram, and Kamalapuram, mostly for the expansion of Salem Airport's runway to handle large aircraft like Boeing 737,777,787's and Airbus A320, A350's. The existing runway is 6000 ft (1806 metres) long which can only handle ATR aircraft.

"The Ministry of Civil Aviation needed additional of 570 acres to expand the airport. If we get that additional 570 acre lands, we could lay runways up to 8,000 ft(2438 metres) to accommodate other Boeing aircraft," said an official from Salem Airport.

He said a warehouse and a hangar to provide maintenance to aircraft would be set up in 100 acres.

The newly proposed expansion falls under the UDAN scheme, an initiative jointly funded by the Central and state governments across India that aims to 'let the common citizen fly'.

This expansion is mainly viewed for the operation of large flights to major destinations like Delhi, Mumbai and for the night parking facility of aircraft from Bangalore, Chennai.

Protests 
The protests have been going on for the expansion of Salem Airport long back from 2010 when the then state government started acquisition of lands. The villagers forcibly stopped the survey and even held the team of officials, hostage for sometime.

On 27 April 2018, hundreds of farmers and their family members laid a siege to the Salem collectorate to protest against land acquisition for airport expansion in the city. The primary reason for the protest has been the safeguard of the land and livelihoods. The proposed expansion of the airport requires 567 acres of land. The land for the initial airport was acquired in 1989 from the parents and grandparents of those protesting now. When the Salem district administration began formalities to acquire lands for the expansion, the farmers and the residents strongly opposed. They also urged the district administration and chief minister Edappadi K. Palaniswami to drop land acquiring activity even as they were assured of huge amounts in compensation.

In June 2018, activists including Piyush Manush and Mansoor Ali Khan were arrested for protesting against the airport expansion.

New airport 
The protestors around the Salem Airport area are requesting for a new airport in another location of the city. The main reason for this protest of farmers is spoiling their livelihood by acquiring 570 acres of fertile lands which are at a long distance from the city center instead of using the thousands of acres of lands which are available and far more easily accessible at 10 to 15 kilometres from the city center. Two such areas are the steel plant area of SAIL and the magnesite mining area of TANMAG.

 The Salem Steel Plant has a total area of 4000 acres of land out of which 2500 acres of land are not on use. This area is easily accessible from the city center.
 The Tamil Nadu Magnesite Limited (TANMAG) which has over 17 km2 (4200 acres) of land in Jagirammapalayam, Vellakalpatti, Thathayangarpatti, Senkaradu, Chettichavadi, and Kurumbapatti villages which were used for mining activities are kept unused for a long time after the company stopped the mining which is very much near the newly proposed bus port. This site would be more feasible because of the availability of vast area land which can be used for further expansion also.

The Airports Authority of India has already said that even if the land is acquired for current airport also, its runway has to be broken down and a new runway should be built which would almost cost the same as building a new airport. This is also the reason why farmers and protestors are opposing the expansion of current airport and requesting the officials to stop the acquisition and change the location of the airport.

References 

Airports in Tamil Nadu
Transport in Salem, Tamil Nadu
Buildings and structures in Salem, Tamil Nadu
1993 establishments in Tamil Nadu
Airports established in 1993
20th-century architecture in India